The Fly is a 1958 American science fiction horror film and the first installment in The Fly film series. The film was produced and directed by Kurt Neumann and stars David Hedison, Patricia Owens, Vincent Price, and Herbert Marshall. The screenplay by James Clavell is based on the 1957 short story of the same name by George Langelaan.

The film tells the story of a scientist who is transformed into a grotesque human–fly hybrid after a common house fly enters unseen into a molecular transporter with which he is experimenting, resulting in his atoms being combined with those of the insect. The film was released in CinemaScope with color by Deluxe by 20th Century Fox. It was followed by two black-and-white sequels, Return of the Fly (1959) and Curse of the Fly (1965). A remake directed by David Cronenberg was released in 1986.

Plot 
In Montreal, Quebec, scientist André Delambre is found dead with his head and arm crushed in a hydraulic press. Although his wife Hélène confesses to the crime, she refuses to provide a motive, and begins acting strangely. In particular, she is obsessed with flies, including a supposedly white-headed fly. André's brother, François, lies and says he caught the white-headed fly. Thinking he knows the truth, Hélène explains the circumstances of André's death.

In flashback, André, Hélène, and their son Philippe are a happy family. André has been working on a matter-transporter device called the disintegrator-integrator. He initially tests it only on small, inanimate objects, such as a newspaper, but he then proceeds to living creatures, including the family's pet cat (which fails to reintegrate, but can be heard meowing somewhere) and a guinea pig. After he is satisfied that these tests are succeeding, he builds a man-sized pair of chambers.

One day, Hélène, worried because André has not come up from the basement lab for a couple of days, goes down to find André with a black cloth draped over his head and a strange deformity on his left hand. Communicating only with typed notes and knocking, André tells Hélène that he tried to transport himself, but that a fly was caught in the chamber with him, which resulted in the mixing of their atoms. Now, he has the head and left arm of a fly; and the fly has his miniature head and left arm, though he keeps his mind.

André needs Hélène to capture the fly, so he can reverse the process. After she, her son, and their housemaid exhaustively search for it, she finds it, but it slips out a crack in the window. André's will begins to fade as the fly's instincts take over his brain. Time is running out, and while André can still think like a human, he smashes the equipment, burns his notes and leads Hélène to the factory. When they arrive, he sets the hydraulic press, puts his head and arm under, and motions for Hélène to push the button. André's arm falls free as the press descends, and trying not to look, she raises the press, replaces the arm, and activates the machine a second time.

Upon hearing this confession, the chief detective on the case, Inspector Charas, deems Hélène insane and guilty of murder. As they are about to haul her away, Philippe tells François he has seen the fly trapped in a web in the back garden. François convinces the inspector to come and see for himself. The two men see the fly, with both André's head and arm, trapped on the web as Philippe told them. It screams, "Help me! Help me!" as a large brown spider advances on it. Just as the spider is about to devour the creature, Charas crushes them both with a rock. Knowing that nobody would believe the truth, François and Charas decide to declare André's death a suicide so that Hélène is not convicted of murder.

In the end, Hélène, François, and Philippe resume their daily lives. Sometime later, Philippe and Hélène are playing croquet in the yard. François arrives to take his nephew to the zoo. In reply to his nephew's query about his father's death, François tells Philippe, "He was searching for the truth. He almost found a great truth, but for one instant, he was careless. The search for the truth is the most important work in the whole world and the most dangerous". The film closes with Hélène escorting her son and François out of the yard.

Cast 

 David Hedison (credited as Al Hedison) as André Delambre
 Patricia Owens as Hélène Delambre
 Vincent Price as François Delambre
 Herbert Marshall as Inspector Charas
 Kathleen Freeman as Emma
 Betty Lou Gerson as Nurse Anderson
 Charles Herbert as Philippe Delambre
 Eugene Borden as Dr. Éjoute
 Torben Meyer as Gaston

Production

Development 

Producer-director Kurt Neumann discovered the short story by George Langelaan in Playboy magazine. He showed it to Robert L. Lippert, head of 20th Century Fox's subsidiary B-movie studio, Regal Pictures. The film was to be made by Lippert's outfit, but was released as an "official" Fox film, not under the less-prestigious Regal banner.

Lippert hired James Clavell to adapt Langelaan's story on the strength of a previous sci-fi spec script at RKO, which had never been produced. It became Clavell's first filmed screenplay. As Harry Spalding recalled, the script was "the best first draft I ever saw, it needed very little work".

The adaptation remained largely faithful to Langelaan's short story, apart from moving its setting from France to Canada, and crafting a happier ending by eliminating a suicide.

Casting 
Lippert tried to cast Michael Rennie and Rick Jason in the role of André Delambre, before settling on then mostly unknown David Hedison (billed as "Al Hedison" on-screen). Hedison's "Fly" costume featured a  fly's head, about which he said: "Trying to act in it was like trying to play the piano with boxing gloves on". Hedison was never happy with the makeup, but makeup artist Ben Nye remained very positive about his work, writing years later that despite doing many subsequent science-fiction films, "I never did anything as sophisticated or original as The Fly".

Years later, Vincent Price recalled the cast finding some levity during the filming: "We were playing this kind of philosophical scene, and every time that little voice [of the fly] would say 'Help me! Help me!' we would just scream with laughter. It was terrible. It took us about 20 takes to finally get it".

Filming 
Sources vary as to the budget, with one giving it as $350,000, another as $325,000, and others as high as $495,000. The shoot lasted 18 days in total. Lippert said the budget was $480,000. Photographic effects were handled by L. B. Abbott, with makeup by Ben Nye.

It was photographed in 20th Century Fox's trademarked CinemaScope with color by Deluxe. A $28,000 laboratory set was constructed from army surplus equipment.

Release

Theatrical
The Fly was released in July 1958 by 20th Century Fox. Producer-director Kurt Neumann died only a few weeks after its premiere, never realizing he had made the biggest hit of his career. One source claims it was on a double bill with Space Master X-7.

Reception

Box office 
The film was a commercial success, grossing $3 million at the domestic box office against a budget less than $500,000, and becoming one of the biggest hits of the year for Fox studios. It earned $1.7 million in theatrical rentals. Lippert claimed it earned $4 million.

The film's financial success had the side effect of boosting co-star Vincent Price (whose previous filmography featured only scattered forays into genre film) into a major horror star. Price himself was positive about the film, saying, decades later, "I thought THE FLY was a wonderful film – entertaining and great fun".

Critical response
Upon its initial release, The Fly received mixed reviews. Critic Ivan Butler called the film "the most ludicrous, and certainly one of the most revolting science-horror films ever perpetrated", and Carlos Clarens offered some praise for the effects, but concluded that the film "collapses under the weight of many... questions". The New York Times critic Howard Thompson was more positive, writing: "It does indeed contain, briefly, two of the most sickening sights one casual swatter-wielder ever beheld on the screen... Otherwise, believe it or not, The Fly happens to be one of the better, more restrained entries of the "shock" school... Even with the laboratory absurdities, it holds an interesting philosophy about man's tampering with the unknown". Variety was also fairly positive: "One strong factor of the picture is its unusual believability. It is told, by Clavell and Neumann, as a mystery suspense story, so that it has a compelling interest aside from its macabre effects". "A first rate science-fiction-horror melodrama", declared Harrison's Reports, adding, "the action grips one's attention from the opening to the closing scenes, and is filled with suspenseful, spine-chilling situations that will keep movie-goers on the edge of their seats". Philip K. Scheuer of the Los Angeles Times called the film "frightening, which is naturally its primary purpose. It is also more skillful in concept and execution than the average science-fiction effort". A mixed review in The Monthly Film Bulletin wrote: "The early sequences of this film have great mystery and tension, and the situation is ingeniously built up. But the film soon becomes as nauseating as its bare outline suggests; even the moments which in healthier pictures might provoke a laugh through sheer absurdity offer little relief".

Modern reviews have been more uniformly positive. The film holds a 95% "Fresh" rating on Rotten Tomatoes based on 42 reviews, with the consensus: "Deliciously funny to some and eerily presicient to others, The Fly walks a fine line between shlocky fun and unnerving nature parable". Cinefantastique's Steve Biodrowski declared that "the film, though hardly a masterpiece, stands in many ways above the level of B-movie science fiction common in the 1950s". Critic Steven H. Scheuer praised it as a "superior science-fiction thriller with a literate script for a change, plus good production effects and capable performances". The Fly was nominated for the 1959 Hugo Award for Best SF or Fantasy Movie at the 17th World Science Fiction Convention.

Year-end lists
American Film Institute Lists
 AFI's 100 Years...100 Thrills – nominated
 AFI's 100 Years...100 Movie Quotes: "Help me! Help me!" – nominated

Legacy
The success of the film encouraged Lippert to hire Clavell to make his directorial debut with Five Gates to Hell (1959).

Other media

Sequels

The film spawned two sequels, Return of the Fly (1959) and Curse of the Fly (1965).

Remake series

A remake, also titled The Fly, was directed by David Cronenberg and released in 1986. A sequel, The Fly II, was released in 1989 without Cronenberg's involvement.

See also 

 List of American films of 1958

References

Further reading 
 Warren, Bill. Keep Watching the Skies, American Science Fiction Movies of the 50s, Vol. II: 1958–1962. Jefferson, North Carolina: McFarland & Company, 1986. .

External links 

 
 
 
 
 

The Fly (franchise)
1958 films
1958 horror films
1950s monster movies
1950s science fiction horror films
1950s horror thriller films
American monster movies
American science fiction horror films
1950s English-language films
1950s French-language films

Films directed by Kurt Neumann
Films with screenplays by James Clavell
Films based on short fiction
Films based on science fiction short stories
Films set in Montreal
Films shot in Los Angeles
Films about shapeshifting
20th Century Fox films
Teleportation in films
Experimental medical treatments in fiction
Fictional flies
Mad scientist films
Mariticide in fiction
CinemaScope films
Films scored by Paul Sawtell
1950s American films